Just One Night is a 1980 double album by Eric Clapton, recorded live at the Budokan Theatre, Tokyo, Japan, December 1979 when Clapton was touring to support Backless, his latest record at that time. The sleeve contains a Japanese painting by Ken Konno. The album reached No. 2 in the U.S. and No. 3 in the UK, and was certified gold by RIAA.

Reception

Critical reaction to the album has been largely positive. At the time of release Robert Christgau said the album contained "AM and FM faves" which were "served hot, raw, or both". "Ultimate Classic Rock" ranked the album in the "Top 100 Live Albums", and suggested that it was superior to the studio albums recorded by Clapton at the time.

Track listing

Side 1 
 "Tulsa Time" (Danny Flowers) – 4:00  (1979-12-03)
 "Early in the Morning" (Traditional arranged by Eric Clapton) – 7:11  (1979-12-03)
 "Lay Down Sally" (Clapton, Marcy Levy, George Terry) – 5:35  (1979-12-04)
 "Wonderful Tonight" (Clapton) – 4:42  (1979-12-04)

Side 2 
"If I Don't Be There by Morning" (Bob Dylan, Helena Springs) – 4:26  (1979-12-04)
 "Worried Life Blues" (Big Maceo Merriweather) – 8:28  (1979-12-04)
 "All Our Past Times" (Clapton, Rick Danko) – 5:00  (1979-12-04)
 "After Midnight" (J.J. Cale) – 5:38  (1979-12-03)

Side 3 
"Double Trouble" (Otis Rush) – 8:17  (1979-12-04)
 "Setting Me Up" (Mark Knopfler) – 4:35  (1979-12-04)
 "Blues Power" (Clapton, Leon Russell) – 7:23  (1979-12-04)

Side 4 
"Rambling On My Mind"/"Have You Ever Loved A Woman" (Robert Johnson/Traditional/Billy Myles) – 8:48  (1979-12-04)
 "Cocaine" (J.J. Cale) – 7:39  (1979-12-04)
 "Further on Up the Road" (Joe Veasey, Don Robey) – 7:17  (1979-12-04)

Personnel

 Eric Clapton – electric guitar, lead and backing vocals
 Albert Lee – electric guitar, backing and lead vocals ("Setting Me Up"), organ ("Worried Life Blues")
 Chris Stainton – keyboards
 Dave Markee – bass guitar
 Henry Spinetti – drums

Chart performance

Weekly charts

Year-end charts

References

External links
 

Eric Clapton live albums
RSO Records live albums
Albums produced by Jon Astley
1980 live albums
Albums recorded at the Nippon Budokan